The Marching Illini (MI) is the marching band of the University of Illinois Urbana-Champaign. The Marching Illini is an organization which annually includes approximately 400 students enrolled in the University of Illinois. Part of the College of Fine and Applied Arts and Illini Athletics, the Marching Illini represent virtually every college, discipline, and major on the university's diverse Urbana-Champaign campus.

Performances
The Band primarily performs before, during, and after University of Illinois home football games. The band also performs an indoor concert at the Assembly Hall featuring special lighting effects, performances by individual sections, and slightly pithy comic routines. Other performances include a drill for the Illini Marching Festival, halftime performance for the Chicago Bears at Soldier Field, halftime performances at postseason bowl games, and an annual away performance at the home football game of another Big Ten school. The MI does not typically perform for parades other than marching to and from the stadium for home games, the annual Homecoming parade, and when marching to and from Foellinger Auditorium where they play several outdoor concerts for University events. In addition the Marching Illini have performed at the 1992, 1995, 1998, 2008, 2014, 2018, and 2022 St. Patrick’s Day Parade in Dublin, Ireland and the 2015 Macy's Thanksgiving Day Parade in New York City. The Sousa Archives and Center for American Music at the University of Illinois houses a collection of University Band recordings. The audio recordings consists of reel-to-reel tapes of performances and recording sessions from 1940-1987. On Saturday August 28, 2021, the band debuted a hip hop remixed version of their traditional blues riffed "Low Brass" entitled "Illini Anthem" performed by Rap Artist Jarrel Young and produced by University of Illinois School of Music Professor Lamont Holden, also known as TheLetterLBeats which broke ground as the first rap song to officially represent a Big Ten, FBS and/or state collegiate institution as a fight song.

Instrumentation

Instrumentation of the Marching Illini is based upon the composition of a typical concert band, but modified in several ways to support outdoor performance. Piccolos are used instead of flutes. Mellophones replace the [horns]. A larger-than-usual section of metal sousaphones adds a deeper low brass sound, not to mention visual interest. The band has a higher-than-usual proportion of low- and mid-range brass instruments (baritone, trombone, sousaphone, and mellophone) and the complete woodwind section that allows the band to play traditional concert band repertoire (unlike all-brass marching bands). An auxiliary color guard and female dance squad (dubbed the "Illinettes") contribute another visual element to the band's performances.

Style

The band performs in a style common to other marching bands of the Big Ten collegiate athletic conference. While the band prides itself on developing innovations in marching, its style is somewhat conservative when compared to other marching bands. The band move among precise drill formations (unlike East Coast scramble bands) and typically remain in a symmetric arrangement about the 50-yard line in abstract patterns (contrast with drum and bugle corps, who ordinarily feature a much greater breadth of formations). The drill style of the band is a necessity since the band performs an entirely new show for every home football game; thus the formations, while considerably complex, must be efficiently memorized by the ensemble.

Organization

Director 
Professor Barry L. Houser was named as Visiting Assistant Director of Bands and Conductor of Athletics Bands (including Director of the Marching Illini and Basketball Band) in July 2011. Professor Houser served as Director of the Marching Panthers and Basketball Band at Eastern Illinois University while also serving as Acting Director of Bands at EIU from 2008 to 2011 after receiving a graduate degree from the University of Illinois. As a graduate student, Houser instructed with the Marching Illini as a Graduate Assistant, frequently conducting from the backfield podium during performances. Houser attended the University of Florida as an undergraduate and has been involved with the nationally renowned Smith-Walbridge Clinics for drum majors and marching bands with Director Emeritus of the Marching Illini Gary E. Smith. Houser now serves as Director and Head Clinician with Smith-Walbridge.

Houser's immediate predecessor was Dr. Peter J. Griffin.  He became the Assistant Director of Bands in 1994.  During his tenure at Illinois, he served as Coordinator of Band Festivals and Assistant Director of the Marching Illini.  Upon the resignation of Director Tom Caneva in 2006, Griffin was chosen as an interim replacement.  Griffin was named as the permanent director in December 2006 and served in that position until May 2011, when he took the position of Chair of the Music Department at Elmhurst College.

Auditions

All members of the Marching Illini band are selected by a music and marching audition. High school seniors planning to attend UI, transfer students, Parkland (community) College students, and current UI students are allowed to audition for the Marching Illini. Students must be accepted into the university before setting up an audition time. Since audition results are announced in early May, students must complete their audition by April 28. Auditions continue through the summer for open positions only. If a student desires to audition on multiple instruments (for instance, alto and tenor saxophone) they may sign up for multiple time slots.

Some positions, such as Illinettes, Illini Drumline, Marching Illini Colorguard, and drum majors, have earlier auditions.  These positions are generally more competitive and may have a series of camps and auditions starting as early as January.

Traditions

Pregame Show

(Pre-2021) The traditional Marching Illini pregame show showcases many varieties of marching styles, and is designed to showcase the band's pride in the school, state, and country. The entire show, performed 17–24 minutes before the start of every home football game, consists of seven songs and is nearly 12 minutes in length. The pregame show remains consistent for each game and does not change unlike the halftime shows.  Band members "peel" onto the field from both end zones populating the field from the end zone to the 50 yard line. To keep distance in between members, each student will hit the yard line at their assigned number - 1,3,5, or 7.  While the stadium can't hear it, members scream out 1,3, 5, 7 each time they hit the yard line.  Once all students were place, horns snapped to attention and the first note erupts in the stadium.  During the Pregame Show, the Marching Illini forms the outline of the United States of America and the five point star.  Designed for viewing from both sides of Memorial Stadium, the west side serves as the ‘home side’ of the two-sided pregame show.  With the move of the student section and the "Block-I" to the north end of the stadium, the Marching Illini have reoriented their final set for William Tell to face north at the end of the show to play directly to the new student section.

(2021-Present) The new arrangement for pregame consists now of 8 songs and is nearly 15 minutes in length. The band begins their pre-game performance by marching from the Illini Armory Building to the stadium where they now come out of the tunnel beneath the scoreboard. This change was made so band wouldn't be seen until the very start of its performance. The new song added to the pregame performance is titled "Oskee Fanfare" and is the first piece played after running out of the tunnel. On Sep 4, 2021, at the UTSA vs UIUC football game, The Marching Illini debuted their new uniforms.

B1G Flags
The Marching Illini is the first Big Ten band to include the flags of every Big Ten school in their pregame performance. The new tradition debuted on August 28, 2021, at the Nebraska vs Illinois football game.

Halftime Show

Three-In-One

The Three-In-One is a tradition forged in the early years of the band’s history from three distinct pieces of the University’s heritage.  The Marching “ILLINI” formation was created by A.A. Harding and his assistants in the early 1920s, making it the oldest part of the Three-In-One.  The marching drill for this formation originally consisted of a march down the field in a “Block I” formation, and a marching into the ILLINI formation once the band had marched back downfield.  The present-day version of the Marching ILLINI is similar to the original, but is highlighted by an intricate countermarch that allows the band to form the ILLINI letter by letter as it marches back down the field.

Another important piece of the Three-In-One, Chief Illiniwek was a part of the tradition since 1926.  The Chief appeared at the home football game against Pennsylvania that year, dancing to the newly-written “March of the Illini” before going to midfield to meet a Pennsylvania band member dressed up as a Quaker, and smoke a peace pipe.  Chief Illiniwek’s dance is loosely patterned after Native American ceremonial fancy dance.  The dance consists of two main parts, the downfield dance and the solo dance.  The regalia worn by the Chief was purchased from Sioux Chief Frank Fools Crow in 1983;  it is topped by a headdress of turkey feathers (in place of endangered eagle feathers).  There have been 34 men who have portrayed the Chief, and one woman who appeared as Princess Illiniwek.

The musical portion of the Three-In-One consists of three distinct Illinois pieces:  “Pride of the Illini,” “March of the Illini,” and “Hail to the Orange.”  “Pride of the Illini,” written by Karl King with words by Ray Dvorak expressly for the Illinois Bands, was published in 1928.  Harry Alford’s “March of the Illini” was also published in 1928, but was used during Chief Illinwek’s performance from the beginning in 1926. ″Hail to the Orange″ was written by Harold V. Hill with words by Howard R. Green in 1910. The three pieces were eventually combined into a medley and given the title, “Three-In-One.”  The “Three-In-One” drill and music are an important part of the University’s heritage.

Chief Illiniwek was retired by the University of Illinois in 2007. The Chief last danced to the Three in One on February 21, 2007 at a men's basketball game. However, the Marching Illini continues to perform the Three in One at halftime of football games.

Recently, there have been calls to remove the music of the Three in One completely from performances. Stephen Kaufman, a professor at the University of Illinois and a longtime opponent of Chief Illiniwek, brought the issue up at a faculty meeting in October 2015. He asked Interim Chancellor Barbara Wilson to take action and stop the Marching Illini from performing the Three in One at future events because of its link to Chief Illiniwek. Kaufman also threatened to approach the NCAA about the situation if no further action was taken. Wilson refused to take action on the matter.

Revised Entrance #3 and Patriotic Medley

"Revised Entrance #3", originally based on the ″Governor′s March″ (1935) by Col. Armin F. Hand, the pregame opener and calling card of the Marching Illini, combines an opening fanfare with a march version of the Illinois state song. The band moves into dual U of I logos, and then transform into four arcs – two arcs facing each sideline.  Sousaphones and percussion are centered between the arches, while the auxiliaries flank both sides of the band. “Patriotic Medley” follows, and the winds adjust to an outline of the United States, while the percussion form the state of Illinois with one cymbal player strategically placed in Champaign.  At the climatic point of “God Bless America,” a dramatic high chair 4-count turn to the home stands accompanies a downward cascade in the music, and the crowd invariably applauds.  After a short mark-time, the formation changes to a large rectangle.  During “Battle Hymn of the Republic,” the rectangle compresses into a circle, pentagon, and finally a star, where the band halts and finishes the medley with the closing phrases of “America The Beautiful.”

Illinois Loyalty

Illinois Loyalty is the Illinois school song and was written by Thacher Howland Guild specifically for the university. It was first performed by the University Military Band in concert on March 3, 1906. As the only band at the university in 1906 the Military Band functioned as a marching, ceremonial and concert band.

Oskee Wow-Wow

Oskee Wow-Wow was written in 1910 by two students, Harold V. Hill (music) and Howard R. Green (words), and was copyrighted in 1911. It was intended as an entry for a skit contest. Oskee Wow-Wow is an invented phrase similar to other college cheers and yells of that period. The song is used as the Illinois fight song since Illinois Loyalty is not well-suited for rousing a crowd during a game. The university is somewhat unusual in this regard, as it is uncommon for a school to have a separate fight song and school song.

Hail to the Orange

The Illinois Alma Mater, Hail to the Orange, also written in 1910 by Hill and Green is performed as part of Three in One at the end of each halftime performance. It is sung a cappella in 4-part harmony by the Marching Illini before the band is dismissed at the end of the post-game concert following each home game. This song is also used as the Sigma Alpha Epsilon fraternity song "Hail to the Purple."

On 19 June 2014 the University Summer Band conducted by Linda Moorhouse played a tribute to traditional Illinois marches and songs and to the Marching Illini as part of the Twilight Concert series. Guest conductors were MI directors Gary Smith, Thomas Caneva and Barry L. Houser along with former band faculty family members Robert Hindsley, William Kisinger and Mark Duker. Former band member Dave Shaul was the announcer. 

The Illinois pieces played were: 
 Cheer Illini (H.V. Hill & H.R. Green) 
 Entrance #3 (A.F. Hand, unrevised) 
 Glory of the Gridiron (H. Alford) 
 Hail to the Orange (Hill & Green) 
 Illini Fantasy 2006 (J. Curnow) 
 Illinois Loyalty (Guild) 
 Illinois March (E.F. Goldman/arr. Leidzen) 
 Illinois State Song (A. Johnston/arr. M. Hindsley) 
 March of the Illini (H. Alford) 
 Oskee Wow-Wow (Hill & Green) 
 Pride of the Illini (K. King)
 Three-In-One (revised) 
 University of Illinois March (Sousa/ed. Keene)

Travel

The Marching Illini returned to Dublin, Ireland in March, 2022 as part of their tradition of playing in Ireland every four years since 1992.

History
The first marching band unit of record at the university in the fall of 1868 was a tenor drum played by Will A. Reiss, bass drum played by Will Crane and fife played by George H. Lyman. After Christmas, these three were joined by several brass players who brought instruments from home. Following the University′s purchase of a set of brass instruments in 1870 sixteen band members petitioned the administration for a teacher. I.W. Colberg, a music teacher in Urbana, was hired to provide music lessons and marching drills for two years until the spring of 1873. As part of the Military Department, the band provided music for battalion drills, chapel exercises and ceremonies.

The University Cornet Band (brass band) played for the dedication of University Hall 10 December 1873. This building, which was demolished in 1938, was home to the bands for many years until 1928. The north entrance, seen in the background of several band photos of the 1890s, survives as the Hallene Gateway at the southwest corner of Lincoln Avenue and Illinois Street in Urbana.

The Cornet Band played an important role in the Decennial (Tenth) Anniversary Celebration of the founding of the university observed on 10 March 1877. In that year the band of 14 players had its second outside instructor, Herbert Mulliken, leader of the brass band in Champaign. The festivities of the day included a visit by members of the Illinois General Assembly whose special train from Springfield was met at the Wabash depot in Tolono by the band and university officials. An Illinois Central train took them to the Doane House in Champaign. After lunch, the military battalion and band escorted the visitors from the Doane House to the Drill Hall on Springfield Avenue where a military demonstration was held. The visitors then walked behind the band to University Hall for speeches by Speaker of the House James Shaw, Regent John Milton Gregory and Governor Shelby Moore Cullom plus other entertainments. At the end of the day the band escorted the group back to the train. While on the train back to Springfield the legislators voted a resolution of hearty support for the regent and the university.

In 1893 the Military Band was invited to perform for two weeks at the World′s Columbian Exposition (world′s fair) in Chicago. Conducted by student leaders Charles Elder and Richard Sharpe, the band played concerts twice daily in the Illinois Building 9 June to 24 June. Soloists were William Sandford, euphonium; Charles Elder, clarinet; William Steele, cornet. The band members slept on cots on the top floor of the building.

New navy blue uniforms were purchased for the Military Band in 1894 with funds raised by the band and contributions from alumni. Until that time the band had worn the same gray uniforms as the military battalion with the addition of a few embellishments. The new uniforms were similar in style to those the band members had seen Sousa's Band wearing in Chicago at the Columbian Exposition.

Mark Hindsley (1906-1999) arrived in Illinois in 1934 as assistant to Harding, was recruited to enlist as a music officer in the Army Air Corps in 1942. While Hindsley (and many of the male students) were gone, the band began to admit women into the concert band program.  In 1950, Hindsley was officially promoted to Director of Bands. Hindsley is also the person credited with coining the name “Marching Illini,” previous to this, the band was simply called "Football Band."

In fall 2020, the band did not play live performances for football in Memorial Stadium because of COVID−19 virus restrictions, and struggled to hold rehearsals online due to latency issues over Zoom. In Memorial Stadium, a surrogate band of 300 photographic cardboard cutouts of all the band members was set up in the band section. Music videos recorded by the band were played on the stadium scoreboard screen. 

The band did perform outdoors during the pandemic with safety protocols in place, including masks, bell covers, staying 6 feet apart, and limited rehearsal times. A small, senior group of Marching Illini members played during the 100th celebration of the Altgeld chimes on Oct. 30.

Facts and Firsts

The Marching Illini was the second band to ever be awarded the prestigious Louis Sudler Intercollegiate Marching Band Trophy in 1983, after only the Michigan Marching Band. In addition to Rose Bowl appearances, the Marching Illini has performed at the All-American, Peach, Liberty, Citrus, Hall of Fame, John Hancock, Holiday, MicronPC.com, Texas, Sugar, Kraft Fight Hunger and Heart of Dallas Bowl games.

In addition to its performances, the University of Illinois Bands could claim the honor of holding the largest collection of original works and papers by John Philip Sousa, until 1994 when these items were transferred from the possession of the band to the university's archives, under the control of the University Library.  These archives remain housed on the upper level of the Harding Band Building.

The Marching Illini can also lay claim to several firsts, which are listed on the band's official website. These include:

 Birthplace of the college concert band - first formal concert given on 3 May 1892, with performances as early as 6 June 1872 when the band played for the first University Commencement. Playing for Commencement ceremonies is the longest running tradition in University Bands.
 First school song - Illinois Loyalty was first performed March 3, 1906
 First college to use Sousaphones - upright bell model sousaphones were purchased in 1906–1907
 First halftime show - in 1907 for the University of Chicago game
 First to form school letters (Block I in parade)
 First Homecoming - first celebrated on 15 October 1910
 First Dad's Day - first celebrated in November, 1920
 First Mom's Day - first celebrated in 1921
 Performed at first football game broadcast on radio (band was heard on WGN experimental play-by-play broadcast, probably in 1924)
 First to sing a cappella on the field - in the Quad Cities during a trip to Iowa in 1920
 Chief Illiniwek made his first appearance in 1926
 First student card section (Block I) formed in 1929
 Referred to by John Philip Sousa as "World's Greatest College Band" in the 1920s
 First band to have its own band building, the Harding Band Building, opened in 1957 on the site of the wooden frame building occupied by the bands from 3 April 1928 to 1956.
 First to have a giant school flag
 First to march mallets at the college level
 First college marching band to release a compact disc ("The Marching Illini" in 1986)
 First college band to march in the St. Patrick's Day Parade in Dublin, Ireland in 1992; first non-Irish band ever to lead the St. Patrick's Day Parade in Dublin, Ireland, in 2008 under the direction of Dr. Peter J. Griffin 
 First Band with a website – first advertised in April, 1994.
 Performed at the first televised football game and the first football game televised in color.
 First band to use field bugles in a field show (1913–14), thus making the Marching Illini the first drum and bugle corps
 Debbie Soumar became the first female Drum Major of the Big Ten in 1977
First rap song performed to officially represent a Big Ten, FBS and/or state collegiate institution as a fight song in 2021

In 2019, band members began using eFlip, a device that attaches to their instrument and holds a smartphone or a tablet that will display sheet music instead of the sheet music stands they've used in the past. This will save time and money -- about $30,000 to $35,000 a year.

Notes

Big Ten Conference marching bands
Musical groups from Illinois
Musical groups established in 1907
1907 establishments in Illinois
University of Illinois Urbana-Champaign student organizations